ASC Tidjikja is a Mauritanean football club based in Nouakchott the capital of Mauritania. The club plays in the Mauritanean Premier League.

Stadium
Currently the team plays at the 10000 capacity Stade Olympique (Nouakchott).

Titles
Mauritanian Premier League
Winner (0): .

Coupe du Président de la République
Winner (0): .
Finalist (1): 2015.

Coupe de la Ligue Nationale
Winner (1): 2018.
Finalist (1): 2017.

Mauritanian Super Cup
Winner (0): .
Finalist (0): .

References

https://www.ffrim.org/super-d1/classement

External links
Soccerway
Web site

Football clubs in Mauritania